Lasse Kjus (born 14 January 1971) is a former World Cup alpine ski racer from Norway. He won the overall World Cup title twice, an Olympic gold medal, and several World Championships. His combined career total of 16 Olympic and World Championship medals ranks second all-time behind fellow Norwegian Kjetil André Aamodt.

Racing career
Born in Oslo, Kjus grew up in Siggerud, but represented the club Bærums SK.

In February 1999, Kjus pulled off one of the most remarkable feats in the history of alpine skiing when he medaled in all 5 events at the 1999 World Championships in Vail, Colorado. Five skiers had previously earned four medals at a single World Championship (through 1980, the Winter Olympics also served as World Championships for alpine skiing): Toni Sailer of Austria in 1956 at Cortina and in 1958 at Bad Gastein, Marielle Goitschel of France in 1966 at Portillo, Chile, Jean-Claude Killy of France in 1968 at Grenoble, Rosi Mittermaier of Germany in 1976 at Innsbruck, and Pirmin Zurbriggen of Switzerland in 1987 at Crans-Montana; the first four did so when only four medal events were contested, but no one before or since has medaled in all five alpine disciplines, downhill, super-G, giant slalom, slalom, and combined or  Super-combined, at a single championship.

He started off on 2 February by tying Austrian great Hermann Maier for gold in super-G. Four days later, in the downhill at nearby Beaver Creek, Kjus settled for silver, 0.31 seconds behind Maier. On 9 February in the combined event, he narrowly missed his second gold, finishing in silver-medal position only 0.16 seconds behind compatriot Kjetil André Aamodt. With momentum building, Kjus captured gold in the giant slalom on 12 February, and then finished off his remarkable run two days later with silver in his weakest event, slalom. He had the lead after the first of two runs of slalom, but skied conservatively to assure he would win a fifth medal. He finished a scant 0.11 seconds behind Kalle Palander of Finland over two runs. Reflecting on his performance that day and the entire fortnight in Colorado, Kjus said "I always try my best, but I could never have dreamed ... maybe I could have skied faster in the second run, but I didn't want to be too aggressive. I knew I could get a podium, and that's all I wanted." He missed winning all five gold medals by a combined total of slightly more than half a second (0.58 seconds). Most impressively, he performed the feat while suffering from a chest infection which had dogged him all winter and often left him coughing and wheezing at the bottom of courses.

A particular curiosity was also his first heat in the Slalom race in Wengen, Switzerland, on 17 January 1999: He got out of the starting gate, got caught with the tip of his right ski, went backwards through the first gate, but finished the heat. He finished third overall – his best World Cup slalom result ever, documented on a YouTube video

Kjus raced for 17 seasons on the World Cup circuit; his first race was in January 1990 in Alta Badia, Italy, and his last in March 2006 in Åre, Sweden.
He won 18 World Cup events (10 in downhill, 2 in super-G, 2 in giant slalom and 4 combined), attained 60 podiums, and had 150 top ten finishes.

Legacy
In February 2015 Kjus (and Aamodt) were selected as recipients of the Legends of Honor by the Vail Valley Foundation, and inducted into the International Ski Racing Hall of Fame.

World Cup results

Season standings

Season titles
2 overall, 1 downhill, 3 combined

^official season title in the combined disciplinewas not awarded until the 2007 season

Race victories
 18 wins – (10 DH, 2 SG, 2 GS, 4 K)
 60 podiums

World Championships results

Olympic results

See also
Alpine Ski World Cup men's race winners

References

External links
 
 

1971 births
Living people
Norwegian male alpine skiers
Olympic alpine skiers of Norway
Olympic gold medalists for Norway
Olympic silver medalists for Norway
Olympic bronze medalists for Norway
Alpine skiers at the 1992 Winter Olympics
Alpine skiers at the 1994 Winter Olympics
Alpine skiers at the 1998 Winter Olympics
Alpine skiers at the 2002 Winter Olympics
Alpine skiers at the 2006 Winter Olympics
People from Ski, Norway
Olympic medalists in alpine skiing
FIS Alpine Ski World Cup champions
Medalists at the 2002 Winter Olympics
Medalists at the 1998 Winter Olympics
Medalists at the 1994 Winter Olympics
Sportspeople from Viken (county)